The men's high jump event at the 2019 World Para Athletics Championships was held in Dubai on 11 November (T64), 13 November (T47) and 14 November (T63).

Medalists 

Events listed in pink were contested but no medals were awarded.

Detailed results

T47 

The event was held on 13 November.

T63 

The event was held on 14 November.

T64 

The event was held on 11 November.

See also 
List of IPC world records in athletics

References 

high jump
2019 in men's athletics
High jump at the World Para Athletics Championships